Princess Astrid, Mrs. Ferner (Astrid Maud Ingeborg; born 12 February 1932) is the second daughter of King Olav V and his wife, Princess Märtha of Sweden. She is the older sister of King Harald V of Norway and younger sister of the late Princess Ragnhild.

Life
Princess Astrid was born on 12 February 1932 at Villa Solbakken to the future King Olav V and Crown Princess Märtha. She was baptized in the Palace Chapel on 31 March 1932 and her godparents were: her paternal grandparents, King Haakon VII and Queen Maud of Norway; her maternal grandparents, Prince Carl and Princess Ingeborg of Sweden; her maternal aunt, Princess Astrid, Duchess of Brabant; Elizabeth, Duchess of York (later Queen Elizabeth The Queen Mother); Princess Thyra of Denmark; Prince Eugen of Sweden; and Prince George of the United Kingdom. Princess Astrid was named after her maternal aunt, paternal grandmother, and maternal grandmother.

Princess Astrid grew up on the royal estate of Skaugum in Asker and was privately educated during her childhood. During World War II, she joined her family fleeing the Nazis and spent the war with her mother, brother and sister in exile in Washington, DC. Following the royal family's return to Norway she attended Nissen's Girls' School and graduated with the examen artium university entrance exam in 1950. She then studied economics and political history for two years at Oxford University.

The princess later learnt other skills including dressmaking and cooking and pursued her interests in handicrafts. Princess Astrid studied ceramics with Halvor Sandøs.

Princess Astrid's mother died on 5 April 1954 from cancer at age 53 when Astrid was 22 years old. From her mother's death until her brother's marriage in August 1968, Princess Astrid was the senior lady of the court and acted as first lady of Norway, working side-by-side with her father on all representation duties, including state visits. Princess Astrid raised her family in Vinderen; she now lives in Nordmarka, Oslo. Her hobbies include knitting, embroidery, reading and painting porcelain.

In 2002, the Government granted the Princess an honorary pension in recognition of all her efforts on behalf of Norway both during and following her years as first lady. In 2005, she took part in ceremonies marking the 60th anniversary of the end of World War II, including the unveiling of a plaque marking the Norwegian monarch's exile in London.

In February 2012, Princess Astrid celebrated her 80th birthday with a private dinner at the Royal Palace in Oslo.

Marriage and children
Princess Astrid married divorced commoner Johan Martin Ferner in Asker on 12 January 1961. Together, the couple have five children, seven grandchildren, and two great-grandchildren.

Patronages

Princess Astrid is chair of the board of Crown Princess Märtha’s Memorial Fund which provides financial support to social and humanitarian initiatives carried out by non-governmental organisations.

She is a patron of several organisations. She has been particularly involved in work for children and young people with dyslexia, herself having that condition.

Foundation 3,14 – Gallery 3,14 (Hordaland International Art Gallery)
The Norwegian Women’s Public Health Association
The Norwegian Women’s and Family Association
The Norwegian Women’s Defence League
Oslo Art Association
The Norwegian Women’s Voluntary Defence Association
Inner Wheel Norway
The Norwegian Dyslexia Association
Dissimilis Norway
Foreningen for Kroniske Smertepasienter ("The Norwegian Association of Chronic Pain Patients")
Trondheim Symphony Orchestra

Titles, styles and honours

Titles
 12 February 1932 – 12 January 1961: Her Royal Highness Princess Astrid of Norway
 12 January 1961 – present: Her Highness Princess Astrid, Mrs. Ferner

Honours

Princess Astrid has been awarded the following orders and decorations:

National honours
 : Grand Cross with Collar of the Order of Saint Olav
 : Dame of the Royal Family Order of Haakon VII of Norway
 : Dame of the Royal Family Order of King Olav V of Norway
 : Dame of the Royal Family Order of King Harald V of Norway
 : Recipient of the King Haakon VII Golden Jubilee Medal
 : Recipient of the Medal of the 100th Anniversary of the Birth of King Haakon VII
 : Recipient of the King Olav V Silver Jubilee Medal
 : Recipient of the King Olav V Commemorative Medal
 : Recipient of the Medal of the 100th Anniversary of the Birth of King Olav V
 : Recipient of the Royal House Centenary Medal
 : Recipient of the King Harald V Silver Jubilee Medal
 : Recipient of the Holmenkollen Medal

Foreign honours
 : Grand Cross of the Order of the Crown
 : Grand Cross of the Order of the White Rose
 : Grand Cross of the Order of Merit
 : Grand Cross of the Order of Merit of the Federal Republic of Germany
 : Grand Cross of the Order of the Falcon
 : Grand Cordon of the Order of the Star of Jordan
 : Grand Cross of the Order of Adolphe of Nassau
 : Grand Cross of the Order of the House of Orange
 : Grand Cross of the Order of Merit
 : Dame Grand Cross of the Order of Isabella the Catholic
 : Member Grand Cross of the Royal Order of the Polar Star
 : Recipient of 90th Birthday Badge Medal of King Gustav V
 : Recipient of 50th Birthday Badge Medal of King Carl XVI
 : Dame Grand Cross of the Order of Chula Chom Klao

Honorific eponym
 Antarctica: Princess Astrid Coast

Ancestry
Astrid is a great-granddaughter of King Edward VII of the United Kingdom and thus a second cousin to Queen Elizabeth II. At the time of her birth, she was 18th in the line of succession to the British throne.

References

External links
Website of the Royal House of Norway: Princess Astrid

1932 births
Living people
Norwegian princesses
House of Glücksburg (Norway)
Recipients of the Order of the Crown (Belgium)
Grand Crosses of the Order of the Crown (Belgium)
Grand Cross of the Ordre national du Mérite
Grand Crosses 1st class of the Order of Merit of the Federal Republic of Germany
Recipients of the Order of the Falcon
Knights Grand Cross of the Order of the Falcon
Recipients of the Order of the House of Orange
Grand Crosses of the Order of the House of Orange
Recipients of the Order of the Crown (Netherlands)
Grand Crosses of the Order of the Crown (Netherlands)
Grand Crosses of the Order of Merit (Portugal)
Recipients of the Order of Isabella the Catholic
Knights Grand Cross of the Order of Isabella the Catholic
Commanders Grand Cross of the Order of the Polar Star
Knights Grand Cross of the Order of Chula Chom Klao
Presidents of the Organising Committees for the Olympic Games
Holmenkollen medalists
Daughters of kings